Jean Paulo Campos (born April 13, 2003) is a Brazilian actor, singer and television presenter. He became known when playing Cirilo in the telenovela Carrossel. In 2014, he repeated the same role in the series Patrulha Salvadora.

Filmography

Film

Television

Theater

Discography

Singles
2015: "Endoidou / Dança do Robô"

Soundtrack
2012: "Peraí" (CD Carrossel Vol. 2)
2014: "SBT 33 Anos - Quem Compartilha Felicidade, Multiplica" (Jingle)
2014: "Muleke Doido"  (DVD Chiquititas Vídeo Hits Volume 3)
2014: "Muleke Doido" (CD Patrulha Salvadora)
2015: "Muleke Doido (Bônus)" (DVD Revista Chiquititas - DVD Chiquititas Vídeo Hits Volume 4)

Awards and nominations

References

External links

2003 births
Living people
Male actors from São Paulo
Afro-Brazilian male actors
Brazilian male child actors
Brazilian male television actors
Brazilian male film actors
21st-century Brazilian male singers
21st-century Brazilian singers
Brazilian television presenters